Andrew David Stewart (born December 5, 1970) is a former Major League Baseball player for the Kansas City Royals.

Stewart hit a double in his first major league plate appearance in September 1997. He was part of Canada's 2004 Olympic Baseball Team in Athens, Greece, where he batted .416 after a four-year layoff coaching in the Toronto Blue Jays and Pittsburgh Pirates organizations. The Canadian team finished in fourth place.

References

1970 births
Baseball people from Ontario
Baseball players at the 1999 Pan American Games
Baseball players at the 2004 Summer Olympics
Canadian expatriate baseball players in the United States
Kansas City Royals players
Living people
Major League Baseball catchers
Major League Baseball players from Canada
Olympic baseball players of Canada
Sportspeople from Oshawa
Winnipeg Goldeyes players
Baseball City Royals players
Wilmington Blue Rocks players
Memphis Chicks players
Wichita Wranglers players
Omaha Royals players
Reading Phillies players
Pan American Games bronze medalists for Canada
Pan American Games medalists in baseball
Medalists at the 1999 Pan American Games